The Legend of Zelda: A Link to the Past is an action-adventure game developed and published by Nintendo for the Super Nintendo Entertainment System. It is the third game in The Legend of Zelda series and was released in 1991 in Japan and 1992 in North America and Europe.

The story is set many years before the events of the first two Zelda games. The player assumes the role of Link as he journeys to save Hyrule, defeat the demon king Ganon, and rescue the descendants of the Seven Sages. It returns to a top-down perspective similar to the original The Legend of Zelda, dropping the side-scrolling gameplay of Zelda II: The Adventure of Link. It introduced series staples such as parallel worlds and items including the Master Sword.

Released to critical and commercial success, A Link to the Past was a landmark game for Nintendo and is considered one of the greatest video games of all time. It was ported to the Game Boy Advance as A Link to the Past and Four Swords in 2002, and sold  copies across both platforms by 2004. It was subsequently re-released on the Wii, Wii U, and New Nintendo 3DS via the Virtual Console, the Nintendo Switch via Nintendo Switch Online, and the Super NES Classic Edition. A spiritual successor, The Legend of Zelda: A Link Between Worlds, was released for the Nintendo 3DS in 2013.

Gameplay

Instead of using the side-scrolling perspective introduced by Zelda II: The Adventure of Link, A Link to the Past reverts to an overhead perspective similar to that of the original The Legend of Zelda. While A Link to the Past still uses mechanics and concepts from the original game, it also introduces new elements and innovations. For instance, arrows are now separate items, as bombs are in the original, instead of using a Rupee to fire an arrow. A Link to the Past also takes concepts from The Adventure of Link, such as the Lamp. Control of Link is more flexible than in previous games, as he can walk diagonally and can run with the aid of the Pegasus Boots. Link's sword attack was improved to swing sideways instead of merely stabbing forward; this gives his sword a broader range and makes combat easier. Link swings his sword as the default attack in future Zelda games, although stabbing is also possible in the later 3D incarnations.

Recurring items and techniques were introduced in A Link to the Past, such as the Hookshot, the Master Sword, the Spin Attack, and the Pegasus Boots. Heart Containers that increase the player's maximum health (hit points) are present, but many are split into "Pieces of Heart", four of which make up one Heart Container. Most of them are well hidden, adding replay value to the game. All dungeons are multi-level, requiring Link to walk between floors and sometimes fall through holes to land on lower levels.

A Link to the Past is the first appearance of what would subsequently become a major Zelda trademark: the existence of two parallel worlds between which the player travels. The first, called the Light World, is the ordinary Hyrule. The second is the Dark World that was created when Ganon corrupted the Sacred Realm. The Dark World is a decaying version of Hyrule. Each location in the Light World corresponds to a similar location in the Dark World, usually with a similar physical structure but an opposite nature (e.g. a desert in the Light World corresponds to a swamp in the Dark World, a peaceful village in the Light World corresponds to a dilapidated town of thieves in the Dark World).

Link can travel from the Dark World to the Light World at almost any outside location by using the Magic Mirror, and can travel back to the Dark World again from the same location using a temporary portal left behind on the map at the point where he reappears in the Light World. Otherwise, Link must use hidden warp locations throughout the Light World to travel from the Light World to the Dark World. Travel between worlds allows for puzzles in A Link to the Past that exploit structural differences between the Light and Dark Worlds, as Link may travel to otherwise inaccessible areas in one world by warping from parallel but accessible locations in the other world.

Plot

Story

A Link to the Past is a distant prequel to the original The Legend of Zelda and Zelda II: The Adventure of Link, and within the official chronology is the first game in the "Defeated Hero" timeline that connects to an alternate reality scenario that the Hero of Time does not succeed in Ocarina of Time. This results in Ganon being imprisoned in the Sacred Realm in his Dark Beast form out of desperation. Having successfully gathered all three pieces of the Triforce, Ganon's evil desires have transformed the realm into the Dark World.

The game begins with Link, the last descendant of the Knights of Hyrule, being awakened by a telepathic message from Princess Zelda, who says that she has been locked in Hyrule Castle's dungeon by Agahnim. Link infiltrates Hyrule Castle and successfully hides Zelda in the Sanctuary as his uncle's last wish. The priest of the Sanctuary tells Link that Agahnim is a powerful wizard planning to free Ganon from the Dark World, known then as the "Sacred Realm" after he was imprisoned for attempting to steal the Triforce for evil reasons. Agahnim's weak point is the Master Sword, a relic weapon only the chosen hero can wield; to do so, the hero must obtain the three pendants.

While the priest keeps Zelda safe, Link begins his journey through Hyrule to collect the pendants. Aided by Sahasrahla, Link successfully collects the three pendants, thus wielding the Master Sword. However, Link finds the dead priest and Zelda held captive by Agahnim. Link confronts him but arrives too late, as Zelda has been sent to the Dark World; Link is sent too and is cursed, becoming an anthropomorphic rabbit. After breaking the curse, Link is ordered to rescue the sealed Seven Sages.

Successful, Link confronts Agahnim once more and kills him. Ganon then appears and flies away to the Dark World's Pyramid of Power. Link falls into the place and combats Ganon. After Ganon is killed, Link touches the Triforce, granting his wish: both his uncle and the priest resurrects, and the king of Hyrule reclaims his throne. In the aftermath, Hyrule is at peace, and Link puts the Master Sword back and returns to a normal life with his uncle.

Setting
Players assume the role of series protagonist Link, a young man living with his uncle south of Hyrule Castle. Princess Zelda, a descendant of the Seven Sages, is held captive in the castle dungeon by Agahnim, a treacherous wizard who has set forth a chain of events to release his dark master. Sahasrahla, a descendant of those who forged the Master Sword, mentors Link on his quest. Series antagonist Ganon remains sealed in the Dark World, the former Sacred Realm corrupted by his evil magic. It is revealed late in the game that Agahnim is an avatar of Ganon, used by the King of Evil to infiltrate the Light World.

Development
In 1988, development of a new NES Zelda began, but one year later, the project was brought to Nintendo's next console; the Super Famicom in Japan, the Super NES in other regions. Producer Shigeru Miyamoto originally intended the game to feature a party, "one that consists of the protagonist, who's a mix between an elf and a fighter, a magic user, and a girl". Due to the success of previous Zelda games, Nintendo was able to invest a large budget and ample development time and resources into the game's production. At the time, most Super NES game cartridges had 4 Mbit (512 KB) of storage space. This game broke the trend by using 8 Mbit (1 MB), allowing the Nintendo development team to create a remarkably expansive world for Link to inhabit. Like Super Mario World, this game used a simple graphic compression method on the Super NES by limiting the color depth of many tiles to eight colors instead of the Super NES's native 16-color tiles. The tiles were decompressed at runtime by adding a leading bit to each pixel's color index. Storage space was also saved by eliminating duplication: The Light World and the Dark World are almost identical in layout (though using differing texture tiles), and the Dark World exists in the ROM only as an "overlay" of the Light World. The script was written by series newcomer Kensuke Tanabe, while Yoshiaki Koizumi was responsible for the background story explained in the instruction manual. Due to time constraints, certain features were cut from the final release, such as the ability to cause wildfires in grassy areas (which would later be incorporated into The Legend of Zelda: Four Swords Adventures).

Music
The score was composed, arranged, and produced by Koji Kondo. The overworld theme of The Legend of Zelda ("Hyrule Overture") returns in A Link to the Past, redone in S-SMP style. The theme is also featured in "Light World Overworld" and in "End Credits". A Link to the Past helped to establish the musical core of the Zelda series. While the first game originated the "Hyrule Overture", many recurring motifs of the Zelda scores come from A Link to the Past, including "Zelda's Lullaby" (Princess Zelda's Theme), "Ganondorf's Theme", "Hyrule Castle" (Royal Family Theme), "Kakariko Village" and "Select Screen/Fairy Cave". These themes have been used in subsequent The Legend of Zelda games. A soundtrack to Kamigami no Triforce, entitled The Legend of Zelda: Sound and Drama, was released by Sony Records in Japan on June 22, 1994. The first disc is 44 minutes long and features rearranged versions of a selection of the game's themes, along with a bonus drama track. The second disc features 54 minutes of the original arrangements for the game and those of the original NES game.

Localization 
The English-language localization included changes to the original Japanese game. The most common change was the removal of religious references to conform with Nintendo of America's content guidelines. The most obvious change was made to the subtitle, which was renamed from Kamigami no Triforce (lit. "Triforce of the Gods") to A Link to the Past. The "Sanctuary" in which Zelda hides is modeled on the Christian chapel, with rows of pews, stained glass windows, a raised chancel and altar, but it contains no overt religious symbols, and the dialogue of characters within it was simplified to remove any religious implication. The font used to represent an unreadable language, Hylian, originally had designs of a vulture and an ankh. These designs were based on Egyptian hieroglyphs which carry religious meanings, and they were altered in the English version. The localization also changed plot details included in the instruction manual. The priest Agahnim became a wizard, and his background, which originally implied that he was sent by the gods, was altered to remove any celestial origin.

Easter egg
In 1990, Nintendo Power held a contest, requiring players to take a photo of the "WarMECH", a powerful and rare enemy in Final Fantasy. As a prize, one of the successful entrants was to be selected at random to appear in an upcoming game, though it was not revealed which game it would be. As a result, a hidden room exists in A Link to the Past  contained 45 blue rupees and a greeting from Chris Houlihan, the winner of the contest, reading "My name is Chris Houlihan. This is my top secret room. Keep it between us, okay?"

The room was intended as a crash prevention measure; the game would send players to this room if it could not determine where Link was going when he goes to another area, and has been found through five different methods. There was no wide awareness of the room until the 2000s, more than a decade after the release of A Link to the Past with the increased popularity of the Internet and Super NES emulators.

The Game Boy Advance re-release, The Legend of Zelda: A Link to the Past and Four Swords, removed the ability to access the room, though it could still be found in the game's code. The Virtual Console re-releases on the Wii, Wii U, and New Nintendo 3DS, as well as the version present on Nintendo Switch Online, contain the room, being emulations of the original game.

Reception 
A Link to the Past was critically acclaimed upon release for its graphics and gameplay, and has since been recognized by critics as one of the greatest video games of all time. It was the first game to receive a near-perfect score of 39 out of 40 from Famitsu magazine. It was awarded Best Sequel of 1992 by Electronic Gaming Monthly. Chicago Tribune selected it as Best Game of the Year, tied with Street Fighter II. A Link to the Past was reviewed in Dragon magazine by Sandy Petersen in 1993, giving it 5 out of 5 stars.

In 1995, Total! listed the game 2nd on its "Top 100 SNES Games". In 1996, GamesMaster rated the game 80th on their "Top 100 Games of All Time". In 2005, IGN editors placed it 11th in its "Top 100 Games", while readers voted it to 5th place, before IGN later ranked it the second best game of all time in 2015 and 2019. In 2006, Entertainment Weekly chose it as the best game of all-time and it was inducted into GameSpots list of the greatest games of all time. It has also been listed as the best game of all time by Next Generation and Popular Mechanics magazines, and as the second best game of all time by G4 and Gamereactor. Members of GameFAQs ranked it the 4th best, and readers of Japanese magazine Famitsu ranked it 31st in a 2006 poll. It also placed 3rd in Electronic Gaming Monthlys list, 23rd in Game Informers, and 3rd in a best 200 Nintendo games list by Nintendo Power. In July 2007, readers of the magazine Edge voted it sixth in a poll of the 100 best games of all time. ScrewAttack placed it 2nd on their list of top 20 Super Nintendo games. GamesRadar named A Link to the Past the third best Super NES game of all time, losing only to Chrono Trigger (2nd) and Super Metroid (1st). It placed eighth (the second-highest Zelda game on the list) in Official Nintendo Magazines "100 greatest Nintendo games of all time" list. In 2009, Game Informer put A Link to the Past 12th on their list of "The Top 200 Games of All Time", saying that it "remains a blast today". This is 11 places ahead of the rank it had back in 2001. In 2018, Complex listed the game 2nd on its "The Best Super Nintendo Games of All Time".  They felt the game is "definitely Nintendo's best first-party title for the SNES".

A Link to the Past and Four Swords for the Game Boy Advance received positive reviews. IGN praised it for being a faithful conversion of the original, but noted that the audio did not sound as crisp on the Game Boy Advance, and found the frequent sound effects tiresome. The game holds the top spot of Metacritic's all-time high scores for Game Boy Advance games with a score of 95.  In 2007, IGN named A Link to the Past and Four Swords the third best Game Boy Advance game of all time. GamePros Star Dingo called it a "masterpiece", as well as an "important part of the Grand Renaissance of the Second Dimension". He also praised the overworld for its secrets and "quirky random characters", adding that playing it required patience and exploring. Star Dingo praised the port of A Link to the Pasts ability to retain its visuals. He specifically praises its "clean sprites", calling its overworld a "colorful, happy place", sarcastically calling it kiddy. He also questioned how the series' cartoon style was abnormal for the series. Star Dingo called the sound effects "indelible", though he noted that they were "a little dated". UGO Networks compared Four Swords to The Legend of Zelda: Oracle of Ages and Oracle of Seasons, calling it "similarly gimmicky". They commented that the best Four Swords brought was its sequel, The Legend of Zelda: The Minish Cap. CNET praised both the original A Link to the Past release as well as the Four Swords multiplayer mode, calling the former a "great handheld port of one of the greatest games ever released for Nintendo's 16-bit system", while describing the latter as "an exciting, replayable multiplayer experience".

Sales
The game was a commercial success upon release. In Japan, it topped the Famitsu sales charts during NovemberDecember 1991 and January 1992, becoming the best-selling 1991 release. In the United States, it became the third best-selling game of 1992 (below Sonic the Hedgehog 2 and Street Fighter II) with one million units sold. It had an exceptionally long stay on Nintendo Powers top games list (ranking number 2 in Nintendo Powers last issue in December 2012): when the Super NES list was retired, A Link to the Past had more than five consecutive years in the number one spot. It was later re-released as a Player's Choice title in North America, indicating that it had sold a minimum of one million copies there. Worldwide, it was one of the best-selling Super NES games, with 4.61 million units sold .

The later Game Boy Advance version in the United States alone sold 1.4 million copies and earned $41 million by August 2006. During the period between January 2000 and August 2006, it was the 8th highest-selling game launched for the Game Boy Advance, Nintendo DS, or PlayStation Portable in that country. The Game Boy Advance version sold 1.89 million units worldwide by 2004, bringing total sales to  units .

Legacy

Chris Houlihan Room
The Escapist, G4TV, GameSpy, Good Game, IGN, Nintendo Life, and PALGN referenced the Chris Houlihan room in articles which discuss video game easter eggs and secrets.

GamesRadar included it in its lists of the greatest video game Easter eggs and the thirteen "video game secrets that were almost never found". GamesRadars Jason Fanelli called it "one of the Zelda franchise's biggest mysteries". GamesRadar'''s Justin Towell included it in his list of the top seven secret rooms in video games at number two. He felt that the contest prize was exciting, and called it "one of the coolest and most exclusive secrets in the Zelda universe". 1UP.com featured it in its list of "25 things you didn't know about The Legend of Zelda".

Comics

A comic book adaptation of A Link to the Past illustrated by Shotaro Ishinomori was published in Nintendo Power that was serialized for 12 issues from January to December 1992. The comic was then re-released as a trade paperback in 1993. The comic is a loose adaptation of the original game's story, featuring several plot changes and new characters. Two other manga were released in Japan: a manga by Ataru Cagiva from 1995 to 1996 that was serialized in Enix Corporation's Monthly GFantasy and later collected into three volumes and a one-volume manga by the duo Akira Himekawa released in 2005 corresponding with the release of Game Boy Advance version. Both follow the game's plot more closely, and the latter introduced a new character called "Ghanti", a thief with a single devil's horn and a star under her eye.

Related games
A French version of this game was released in Canada, making it the only French-only release in North America for the Super NES. This version had the same case as the English release in North America, but the whole game was translated into French. The next Zelda game, Link's Awakening was released in 1993 for the Nintendo Game Boy. It retained many of A Link to the Past gameplay mechanics, including the top-down perspective, as well as an overworld which resembled that of A Link to the Past. After traveling to train abroad, Link is shipwrecked and awakens on an island called Koholint. Beginning on March 2, 1997, a simple unaltered re-release of the original Japanese version of A Link to the Past was broadcast via Satellaview. The game was rebroadcast more often than any other Zelda game on the Satellaview, and was the only Zelda title broadcast by St.GIGA after ties with Nintendo were broken in April 1999. Unlike other two Satellaview Zelda games, Kamigami no Triforce lacked SoundLink support.

Apart from official sequels and re-releases made or licensed by Nintendo, A Link to the Past has proven to be very popular within the game-modding community, inspiring the development of numerous fangames, such as the unofficial 2007 sequel The Legend of Zelda: Parallel Worlds. In 2023, A Link to the Past was reverse-engineered, making unofficial ports possible on a broad range of platforms.

Inishie no Sekiban

In 1997, a follow-up, was released in Japan. Designed exclusively for the Super Famicom's Satellaview peripheral, BS Zelda made use of a voice broadcast system, SoundLink, to provide voice-acting for several characters. The game takes place six years after the events in A Link to the Past and is set in Hyrule's Light World. It lacks a Link character, and instead the player character is known as the Hero of Light. The available player-characters are actually the male and female BS-X avatars that also featured in BS Zelda no Densetsu. The game was divided into four weekly episodes. These episodes were played live, and a voice-acted soundtrack simultaneously ran on the satellite network, sometimes containing suggestions, clues, and plot development for the game currently being broadcast.  Each week, the player could only access certain portions of the overworld. Areas shrouded in clouds were unreachable. Two dungeons were accessible per week, however the episode ended only when time expired and not when the player had completed all the objectives for that week. The  game could only be played during the set hours because the SoundLink content was central to gameplay (and not stored on the base unit or flash-RAM cartridge in any way), and the timer was based on a real-time clock set by the satellite itself.

A Link to the Past and Four SwordsA Link to the Past was re-released for the Game Boy Advance in 2002 in North America and 2003 in other territories as part of The Legend of Zelda: A Link to the Past and Four Swords, a collaborative development effort between Nintendo and Capcom. The port of A Link to the Past contains minor changes from the original, including the addition of voice clips and other sound effects taken from Ocarina of Time and Majora's Mask. Four Swords is a multiplayer adventure that interacts with the single-player adventure. Accomplishments can be transferred between the two; for example, if the player learns a new sword technique, it is made available in both modes. By completing Four Swords, a new dungeon called the Palace of the Four Sword is unlocked in A Link to the Past. In Four Swords, dungeons are randomly generated and are affected by the number of players. If only two players are active, the game ensures that all puzzles generated do not require a third or fourth player to solve. The plot of Four Swords revolves around the wind mage Vaati, who escapes from the Four Sword he is sealed in and captures Princess Zelda to marry her. Link uses the Four Sword to create three copies of himself and rescues Zelda, trapping Vaati in the sword once again. At the time of its release, the story of Four Swords was considered the earliest point in the series' timeline.

A Link Between Worlds

In 2011, Shigeru Miyamoto expressed desire to have A Link to the Past remade for the Nintendo 3DS, stating how attractive the two layers would look. Planning for this successor actually began after the completion of Spirit Tracks in 2009, though full development did not begin until 2012. In April 2013, Nintendo announced in its Nintendo Direct presentation that a new game based on the same world as A Link to the Past was in development for Nintendo 3DS, featuring new 3D visuals, completely new dungeons, new gameplay mechanics, and an original story. On November 22, Nintendo released The Legend of Zelda: A Link Between Worlds, which takes place in the same world, but features a new storyline, new puzzles and original dungeons. Height and depth play a large role by taking advantage of the 3D feature of the 3DS, while maintaining the traditional top-down perspective.

In other mediaA Link to the Past has been prominently represented in other Zelda-related media since its original release, chiefly the Super Smash Bros. series. Several music tracks from the game appear in the game on Zelda-themed stages. Finally, Princess Zelda's design in Super Smash Bros. Ultimate is partially based on her incarnation from A Link to the Past and A Link Between Worlds, replacing her previous incarnations from Ocarina of Time and Twilight Princess.

SpeedrunningA Link to the Past is a popular game for speedrunning. It had the fourth highest number of players of all games listed on Speedrun.com in 2019, though it has since fallen to a lower position. It is commonly run at the Games Done Quick charity marathon, where it is often considered one of the highlights of the event. Many speedrunners also play using A Link to the Past: Randomizer'', a mod that randomizes the locations of most of the items, in an attempt to evoke the uncertainty and excitement of playing the game for the first time.

Notes

References

External links

 
 

1991 video games
New Nintendo 3DS games
Nintendo Entertainment Analysis and Development games
Nintendo Research & Development 2 games
Link to the Past, A
Open-world video games
Satellaview games
Single-player video games
Super Nintendo Entertainment System games
Top-down video games
Video games developed in Japan
Video games directed by Takashi Tezuka
Video games scored by Koji Kondo
Video games about parallel universes
Video games produced by Shigeru Miyamoto
Virtual Console games for Nintendo 3DS
Virtual Console games for Wii
Virtual Console games for Wii U
Nintendo Switch Online games